Leila Williams (born 1937) is a former British beauty queen and television presenter. She was one of the original presenters of Blue Peter, working on the programme from 1958 to 1962.

Career
In 1957 Williams won the Miss Great Britain title. The following year she became the first female Blue Peter presenter, co-presenting with Christopher Trace.

Williams left Blue Peter at the start of 1962, after being made redundant by Clive Parkhurst, a newly appointed producer, with whom she did not get on. Williams recalled "he could not find anything for me to do", and in October, Williams did not appear for six editions, and was eventually sacked, leaving Trace on his own or with one-off presenters. Parkhurst was replaced by John Furness.

She went on to play small parts in the films Watch Your Stern, Marriage of Convenience and The Beauty Jungle, and returned to Blue Peter for the show's 20th anniversary in 1978 and subsequently the 40th anniversary in 1998 and the 60th in 2018.

Personal life
Williams married Fred Mudd, lead singer of the popular music group The Mudlarks, and in the early to mid-1960s had their only child Debra. Whilst the Mudlarks were touring in the early 1970s, she worked as an assistant manager at a Dorothy Perkins clothing store in Harrow. The couple then ran public houses in Kingston-upon-Thames and Surbiton for many years before retiring to Spain. Fred Mudd died there in 2007. Williams is now living in Wanstead East London, in sheltered accommodation and is finishing her autobiography.

References
Notes

Bibliography

External links
 

Blue Peter presenters
1937 births
Living people
People from Walsall
English television presenters
English beauty pageant winners
Miss World 1957 delegates